Afroeurydemus maculipennis is a species of leaf beetle of the Democratic Republic of the Congo, described by Martin Jacoby in 1900.

References

Eumolpinae
Beetles of the Democratic Republic of the Congo
Taxa named by Martin Jacoby
Beetles described in 1900
Endemic fauna of the Democratic Republic of the Congo